Kelly Evernden and Brad Pearce were the defending champions, but did not participate together this year.  Evernden partnered Brett Steven, losing in the semifinals.  Pearce partnered David Rikl, losing in the first round.

Jan Apell and Peter Nyborg won the title, defeating Neil Broad and Gary Muller 5–7, 7–6, 6–2 in the final.

Seeds

  Brad Pearce /  David Rikl (first round)
  Neil Broad /  Gary Muller (final)
  John-Laffnie de Jager /  Christo van Rensburg (quarterfinals)
 N/A

Draw

Draw

References

External links
 Draw
 ITF tournament edition details

Seoul Open
1993 ATP Tour
1993 Seoul Open